Luke Charles Bayer (born 25 August 1992) is an English actor and singer who is known for his work in musical theatre. He is best known for his work in the Original West End Cast of Everybody's Talking About Jamie at the Apollo Theatre and for appearing on The X Factor in 2007.

Early life 

Bayer was born and raised in North Yorkshire, England and attended South Craven School from the age of 11 until he was 18. At the age of 14, Bayer successfully auditioned for The X Factor making it through to Dannii Minogue's judges houses as one of the final six boys. In 2012 Bayer started training at Mountview Academy of Theatre Arts in London, graduating 2015.

Career 
In 2005, Bayer successfully auditioned for the Les Misérables 20th Anniversary Concert at the Sondheim Theatre, London, in which he performed with 34 other young people who had all appeared in the recently released Schools Edition version of the show. Upon completing his training at Mountview Academy of Theatre Arts, Bayer toured China with The 12 Tenors. He has performed three sold out solo concerts at Zedel's in London, guests including fellow West End Performers, Danielle Steers, Jodie Steele,  Nicole Raquel Dennis, amongst others. He is currently represented by Jamie Sampson at 33 Artist Management. Bayer is perhaps most well known for his role as Alternate Jamie in the Original West End Cast of Everybody's Talking About Jamie, for which he won a BroadwayWorld Award for Best Understudy/Alternate in a Show. During his time with the show, Bayer performed as Jamie at Children In Need and West End Live.

Theatre 

Bayer has performed in a number of professional theatre productions. He appeared in the European Premiere of Yank! The Musical at the Hope Mill Theatre Manchester in early 2017. Following on from his success in Jamie, he appeared in hit new musical Fiver, written by Alex James Ellison & Tom Lees. He won a West End Wilma Award for his role in the show. A Cast Album of the show has since been recorded and released during the COVID-19 pandemic, featuring Bayer. Bayer also appeared alongside Millie O'Connell in the revival of Soho Cinders at the Charing Cross Theatre, playing the role of Robbie. Bayer recorded and released his Debut single 'See You' written by Elliot Clay, which features in the new musical Millennials.

Work

Theatre

Television

Cast recordings

References

External links

 

 
 
 
 Luke Bayer on Spotlight

1992 births
Living people
Alumni of the Mountview Academy of Theatre Arts
English male child actors
English male musical theatre actors
English male stage actors
English male television actors